Semyonov Peak is a  high mountain in the Tian Shan on the border between Kyrgyzstan and Kazakhstan.

Semyonov Peak is one of the highest peaks of the Saryjaz Range. To its northwest lies the Semyonov Glacier. It lies 8.64 km northwest of Khan Tengri (6995 m) on the opposite side of the Northern Engilchek Glacier. The peak is named after the Russian geographer Pyotr Semyonov-Tyan-Shansky.

References

Mountains of Kazakhstan
Mountains of Kyrgyzstan
Five-thousanders of the Tian Shan
Issyk-Kul Region
Landforms of Almaty Region
Kazakhstan–Kyrgyzstan border
International mountains of Asia